Epichloë alsodes is a hybrid asexual species in the fungal genus Epichloë. 

A systemic and seed-transmissible grass symbiont first described in 2017,  Epichloë alsodes is a natural allopolyploid of Epichloë amarillans and Epichloë typhina subsp. poae.

Epichloë alsodes is found in North America, where it has been identified in the grass species Poa alsodes.

References 

alsodes
Fungi described in 2017
Fungi of North America